In electronics, an octave (symbol: oct) is a logarithmic unit for ratios between frequencies, with one octave corresponding to a doubling of frequency.  For example, the frequency one octave above 40 Hz is 80 Hz.  The term is derived from the Western musical scale where an octave is a doubling in frequency. Specification in terms of octaves is therefore common in audio electronics.  

Along with the decade, it is a unit used to describe frequency bands or frequency ratios.

Ratios and slopes 
A frequency ratio expressed in octaves is the base-2 logarithm (binary logarithm) of the ratio:

 

An amplifier or filter may be stated to have a frequency response of ±6 dB per octave over a particular frequency range, which signifies that the power gain changes by ±6 decibels (a factor of 4 in power), when the frequency changes by a factor of 2. This slope, or more precisely 10 log10(4) ≈ 6.0206 decibels per octave, corresponds to an amplitude gain proportional to frequency, which is equivalent to ±20 dB per decade (factor of 10 amplitude gain change for a factor of 10 frequency change).  This would be a first-order filter.

Example
The distance between the frequencies 20 Hz and 40 Hz is 1 octave. An amplitude of 52 dB at 4 kHz decreases as frequency increases at −2 dB/oct. What is the amplitude at 13 kHz?

See also
 Octave
 Octave band
 One-third octave

Notes

References

Acoustics
Audio electronics